Muzga is a rural locality (a village) in Myaksinskoye Rural Settlement, Cherepovetsky District, Vologda Oblast, Russia. The population was 218 as of 2002. There are 4 streets.

Geography 
Ilyinskoye is the nearest rural locality.

References 

Rural localities in Cherepovetsky District